The following highways are numbered 857:

United States